The gigantocellular reticular nucleus (Gi) is a subregion of the medullary reticular formation. As the name indicates, it consists mainly of so-called giant neuronal cells.

This nucleus has been known to innervate the caudal hypoglossal nucleus, and responds to glutamatergic stimuli. The gigantocellular nucleus excites the hypoglossal nucleus, and can play a role in the actions of the said nerve. It additionally receives connections from the periaqueductal gray, the paraventricular hypothalamic nucleus, central nucleus of the amygdala, lateral hypothalamic area, and parvocellular reticular nucleus.

Retrograde studies have shown that the deep mesencephalic reticular formation and oral pontine reticular nucleus project to the gigantocellular nucleus.

The dorsal rostral section of the nucleus reticularis gigantocellularis is also involved in mediating expiration (or out-breathing) along with the parvocellular nucleus.

References

It also receives inputs from the pedunculopontine nucleus.

Medulla oblongata